Amilcare M. Porporato is an Italian-American engineer currently the Addy Professor of Civil and Environmental Engineering at Duke University and an Elected Fellow of American Geophysical Union. His current concerns are earth sciences and its relationships and systems.

References

Year of birth missing (living people)
Living people
Duke University faculty
21st-century American engineers
Italian engineers
Fellows of the American Geophysical Union